Oiti, formerly Gardikaki (Γαρδικάκι), is a village on Mount Oeta in Phthiotis, Greece. Since the 2011 local government reform it is part of the municipality of Lamia, and of the municipal unit of Gorgopotamos. The nearby settlement of Skamnos also belongs to the community of Oiti. Population for the entire community was 222 in the 2011 census, of which 167 in the village of Oiti proper.

References

Populated places in Phthiotis
Mount Oeta